Andrew Brooke is an English actor. He is best known for playing Ashley in the Channel 4 series PhoneShop for three series. He has appeared in the movies such as Sherlock Holmes in 2009, The Bank Job and Children of Men.  His many television appearances include: After Life, Da Vinci's Demons, The IT Crowd, The Inbetweeners, The Mark Steel Lectures, Doctor Who, Pulling, How Not to Live Your Life, The Bible, Law & Order: UK, My Family, Collision, EastEnders, Silent Witness and No Signal. He also produced Escape of the Artful Dodger and One Way Ticket.

Brooke portrayed Ashley in PhoneShop on Channel 4. In an interview, he revealed that, previously in his life he had sold "bread, ad space and furniture". He also said that the show had a "wide demographic". 

In 2020, he played Alistair Cunningham in the BBC drama The Salisbury Poisonings.

Filmography

References

External links

20th-century births
Living people
British male soap opera actors
Year of birth missing (living people)
Place of birth missing (living people)